The Jesup Bees were a minor league baseball team based in Jesup, Georgia that played from 1950 to 1953. The Bees played exclusively as members of the Class D level Georgia State League, winning league pennants in 1951 and 1953. The Bees hosted home games at Milikin Park and permanently folded following the 1953 season.

History
The 1950 Jesup Bees first began play as an expansion team, joining as members of the eight–team Class D level Georgia State League.

In their first season of minor league play, Jesup ended the season in 5th place. The Bees finished with a record of 69–69 in the 1950 Georgia State League standings, playing under manager Herb Stein. The Jesup Bees did not qualify for the playoffs, finishing 14.0 games behind the 1st place Dublin Green Sox. The Jesup Bees drew 23,893 for the season, an average of 346 per game.

The 1951 Jesup Bees captured the Georgia State League pennant. The Bees placed 1st in the six–team regular season standings, ending the regular season with a 86–43 record playing under manager Donald Stoyle, finishing 7.5 games ahead of the 2nd place Dublin Green Sox. In the playoffs, the Douglas Trojans swept the Jesup Bees 4 games to 0. Jesup pitcher Don Rudolph finished with a 28–8 record and a 2.98 ERA, throwing in 285 inning for the Bees. Jesup home season attendance was 23,931.

The 1952 Jesup Bees continued play and finished last in the eight–team Georgia State League. The Jesup Bees finished with a record of 52–73, playing under returning manager Donald Stoyle and player/manager James Warren. The Bees finished 23.5 games behind the 1st place Eastman Dodgers. Jesup total home attendance was 16,657, an average of 267 per game.

In their final season of play, the Jesup Bees won the 1953 Georgia State League pennant. Jesup finished with a regular season record of 78–46, placing 1st in the league under manager Bill Steinecke in the eight–team league. Jesup lost in the first round of the playoffs, being swept by the Eastman Dodgers in four games. The Bees drew 20,629 in 1953 total home attendance. After the 1953 season, both the Jesup and Eastman franchises folded, leaving the 1954 Georgia State League with six teams.

Jesup, Georgia has not hosted another minor league franchise.

The ballpark
The Jesup Bees were noted to have played minor league home games at Milikin Park. Milikin Park was located at Sunset Boulevard & Milikin Street in Jesup, Georgia.

Timeline

Year–by–year records

Notable alumni

Don Rudolph (1950–1951) 
Bill Steinecke (1953, MGR)

References

External links
Baseball Reference

Baseball teams established in 1950
Baseball teams disestablished in 1953
Defunct Georgia State League teams
Professional baseball teams in Georgia (U.S. state)
1950 establishments in Georgia (U.S. state)
1953 disestablishments in Georgia (U.S. state)
Wayne County, Georgia
Defunct baseball teams in Georgia